Manuel Cardoni (born 22 September 1972) is a Luxembourgish former professional football player. He is the Technical Director at Luxembourg national football team.

Cardoni is the son of Furio Cardoni, one of Luxembourg's finest players in the 1970s.

Club career
A tireless midfield playmaker, Cardoni started his career at US Rumelange before joining Luxembourg club Jeunesse Esch in 1992. He was then snapped up by Bundesliga side Bayer Leverkusen, for whom he made only one substitute appearance (against Bayern Munich) in two seasons. He became the third Luxembourgish player in the Bundesliga ever, after Nico Braun and Robby Langers.

He rejoined Jeunesse Esch in 1998 and became player-manager at US Rumelange in 2006.

Cardoni won the Luxembourgish Footballer of the Year award four times (1995, 1996, 1999, 2000). He now serves as an ambassador for the Special Olympics.

International career
Cardoni made his debut for Luxembourg in a May 1993 World Cup qualification match against Iceland and went on to earn 68 caps, scoring 5 goals. He played in 22 World Cup qualification matches.

His final international game was an October 2004 World Cup qualification match against Liechtenstein.

Honours
 Luxembourg National Division: 1995, 1996, 1999, 2004
 Luxembourg Cup: 1999, 2000
 Luxembourgish Footballer of the Year: 1995, 1996, 1999, 2000

References

External links
 

1972 births
Living people
Luxembourgian footballers
Luxembourgian expatriate footballers
Jeunesse Esch players
Bayer 04 Leverkusen players
Bayer 04 Leverkusen II players
Bundesliga players
Expatriate footballers in Germany
Luxembourgian expatriate sportspeople in Germany
US Rumelange players
Luxembourgian football managers
US Rumelange managers
Association football midfielders
Luxembourg international footballers
Luxembourgian people of Italian descent